Michael Buffer (born November 2, 1944) is an American ring announcer (or "MC") for boxing, professional wrestling, and National Football League events. He is known for his trademarked catchphrase: "Let's get ready to rumble!"

Early life
Buffer was born in Philadelphia, Pennsylvania on November 2, 1944. His father was enlisted in the United States Navy during World War II. Buffer's parents divorced when he was 11 months of age, and he was then raised by foster parents, a school bus driver and housewife, in Roslyn, Pennsylvania. He enlisted in the United States Army during the Vietnam War at age 20 and served until age 23. He held various jobs including a car salesman, then began a modeling career at age 32 before becoming a ring announcer at age 38.

Career

Boxing
In 1982, Buffer began his career as a ring announcer. By 1983, he was announcing all boxing matches promoted by Bob Arum's Top Rank on ESPN, which gave him a national identity at a time when ring announcers were strictly locally hired talent. By 1984, Buffer developed the catchphrase "Let's get ready to rumble!" in his announcing, which gained enormous popularity. He began the process of obtaining a federal trademark for the phrase in the 1980s, acquiring it in 1992. Consequently, Buffer has earned in excess of $400 million with the license for his trademark.

By the late 1980s, Buffer was the exclusive ring announcer for all bouts in Donald Trump-owned casinos. Trump said of Buffer, "He's great, he's the choice, he has a unique ability...I told my people, 'We got to have him.'" Buffer's work was also admired by many boxing greats. Sugar Ray Leonard once told Buffer, "When you introduce a fighter, it makes him want to fight."

In 2018, Buffer signed with DAZN to serve as the exclusive ring announcer for all of its boxing broadcasts, which include deals with Matchroom.

Wrestling
Buffer was formerly the exclusive ring announcer for World Championship Wrestling (WCW) main events featuring Hulk Hogan or other top WCW talent until 2001, when the organization folded. WCW's former parent company Time Warner owned through their pay-per-view subscription division HBO, which broadcast many matches from promoter Top Rank, of which Buffer is the lead ring announcer. The exclusivity of his contract with WCW prevented Buffer from announcing for other wrestling-type organizations, forcing him to stop announcing for the UFC (his only UFC cards were UFC 6 and UFC 7). However, when WCW ceased to exist, and Time Warner had no more affiliation with professional wrestling, Buffer was enabled to announce in other wrestling promotions. During the Monday Night Wars, while Buffer was on WCW Monday Nitro, WWF wrestler Triple H created the phrase "Let's get ready to suck it!" to mock him, as part of his D-Generation X gimmick.

On Saturday Night's Main Event XXXV, for the first time in more than six years, Buffer returned to pro-wrestling ring announcing duties at Madison Square Garden in a boxing match between pro boxer Evander Holyfield (who was substituting for Montel Vontavious Porter) and pro wrestler Matt Hardy. Buffer appears in the Royal Rumble 2008 commercial, in which he begins to say "Let's get ready to rumble!" only to be superkicked by Shawn Michaels, causing him to fall over. As well as being in the commercial for the event, he was the guest ring announcer during the Royal Rumble match itself.

Other sports
During his career, Buffer has announced the MLB World Series, the Stanley Cup Finals, NBA Finals, the Volunteer 500 at Bristol Motor Speedway, and NFL playoff games. He was a guest announcer at the 1999 Indianapolis 500 and the 2017 United States Grand Prix.

Buffer, like his brother Bruce, announced early UFC fights, starting at UFC 6 in 1995. He was the host of the Versus boxing retro show Legends of the Ring, produced by Top Rank, Inc., where he was ring announcer for most of their top matches.

On July 19, 2008, he announced the Affliction: Banned mixed martial arts show. On November 10, 2008, Buffer started the heads-up action between the two remaining players, Peter Eastgate and Ivan Demidov at the 2008 World Series of Poker final table with a modified version of his trademark statement: "Let's get ready to shuffle up and deal."

On September 12, 2021, Buffer announced for NBC's Sunday Night Football matchup, where the Los Angeles Rams hosted the Chicago Bears at the first regular season NFL game with fan attendance in SoFi Stadium. He would later announce at the Rams' first home playoff game against the Arizona Cardinals on January 17, 2022, and two weeks later, during the 2022 NFC Championship game against the San Francisco 49ers.

Other appearances
Buffer has appeared on various talk shows hosted by Jay Leno, David Letterman, Arsenio Hall, Conan O'Brien and Jimmy Kimmel. He has also appeared on Saturday Night Live, In Living Color, Mad TV and The Howard Stern Show.

He appeared on NBC's Deal or No Deal on December 10, 2007, and opened the finale of the seventh season of American Idol, a production of RTL. In 2011 he made an appearance on the 12th season of Dancing with the Stars to announce Sugar Ray Leonard week 3 dance. Buffer has also served as ringside announcer for the syndicated television game show The Grudge Match, hosted by Steve Albert and Jesse Ventura.

In the 1997 film Hercules, Hades uses Buffer's catchphrase "Let's get ready to rumble!" during Hercules' fight with Hydra.

He has played himself in various films including Ready to Rumble and Rocky Balboa, and in 2008 Buffer appeared as Walbridge, the main villain in the comedy You Don't Mess with the Zohan. He also appeared in the 2019 remake of Dumbo, portraying a ringmaster who delivers the line "Let's get ready for Dumbo!" in his trademark cadence.

Buffer has been animated in The Simpsons, South Park, and Celebrity Deathmatch. Buffer also appears in the animated TV series Phineas and Ferb in the episode "Raging Bully", as the voice of the announcer for the big thumb-wrestling match with Phineas and Buford.  Buffer appeared in the extended version of the Muppets webisode "Food Fight", where he is seen announcing the cooking competition between Gordon Ramsay and the Swedish Chef.

Buffer appears as featuring artist on "Let's Get Ready to Rumble" and "Go for It All!" by German eurodance group the K.O.'s and his voice was sampled in the Ant & Dec song "Let's Get Ready to Rhumble".  He recorded the introduction track for country artist Josh Turner's 2012 album, Punching Bag.

In 2013, Buffer appeared in Progressive Insurance commercials, promoting their program of combining different coverages into one policy, with a parody of his famous phrase - "Let's get ready to bundle!" 

Buffer reproduced as an action figure in both Toy Biz's WCW line and Jakks Pacific's Rocky line.

In 2022, Buffer introduced Daddy Yankee's final album Legendaddy.

Trademark
Buffer began using the phrase "Let's get ready to rumble!" in 1984. By 1992, he acquired a federal trademark for the phrase. Buffer uses his famous phrase in various licensing deals including the platinum selling album Jock Jams by Tommy Boy Records, the video games Ready 2 Rumble Boxing, Ready 2 Rumble Boxing: Round 2 for the PlayStation 2, Nintendo 64, Dreamcast and Game Boy Advance and Greatest Heavyweights for the Sega Genesis and numerous other products. In addition, he has used variations of the phrase in advertisements, including the popular commercial for Mega Millions in which he says "Let's get ready to Win Big!" and the Kraft Cheese commercial in which he says "Let's get ready to Crumble!" and most recently for Progressive Insurance in which he says "Let's get ready to bundle!"
, the catchphrase has generated $400 million in revenue from licensing the trademark.

Personal life
Buffer's fame has reunited him with long-lost family members. In 1989, Buffer was contacted by his birth father, who introduced Buffer to his half-brothers after seeing him on television. In the mid-1990s, Buffer brought along one of his half-brothers, Bruce Buffer, as his agent/manager. This grew into a business partnership to increase licensing productivity of the trademark.

Buffer first wed at age 21, but the marriage ended in divorce after seven years. He has two sons from his first marriage. More than 25 years passed before he remarried in 1999. He and his second wife divorced in 2003.

On September 13, 2007, while making an appearance on The Tonight Show with Jay Leno, he proposed to his current (third) wife, Christine. Buffer currently resides in Southern California. His half-brother Bruce Buffer is an announcer for the Ultimate Fighting Championship, a leading mixed martial arts promotion.

In 2008, Buffer was treated for throat cancer.

Filmography

See also
Chuck Hull
Jimmy Lennon
Jimmy Lennon Jr.

References

External links

Living people
Boxing people
International Boxing Hall of Fame inductees
Mixed martial arts announcers
People from Philadelphia
Professional wrestling announcers
Public address announcers
United States Army soldiers
1944 births